Dioon mejiae is a species of cycad that is native to Honduras and Nicaragua. In Honduras, it is found in the departments of Colón, Olancho, and Yoro. Common names include palma teosinte, teocinte, teocinta (female), teocintle, teocsinte, teosinte, tiusinte, and tusinte, all of which mean "sacred ear."

References

External links

mejiae
Plants described in 1950
Flora of Honduras
Flora of Nicaragua
Least concern plants